Sunni Hizbullah (born 11 March 1994) is an Indonesian professional footballer who plays as a centre back for Liga 2 club PSIM Yogyakarta.

Club career

Persiba Bantul
Hizbullah started his career by joining Persiba Bantul U-21. On 21 August 2014, he made his first team debut in the Indonesia Super League against Persiram Raja Ampat; Persiba lost 0–3. Hizbullah scored his first goal for Persiba on 5 September 2014, which ended in a 3–2 victory against Persiba Balikpapan.

References

External links 
 
 Sunni Hizbullah at Liga Indonesia

1995 births
Living people
Indonesian footballers
Liga 1 (Indonesia) players
Persiba Bantul players
Association football defenders
People from Sleman Regency
21st-century Indonesian people